Freeze is a 2006 South Korean miniseries starring Lee Seo-jin, Park Han-byul and Son Tae-young. It aired on Channel CGV from October 27 to October 31, 2006 for 5 episodes.

Plot
Baek Joong-won once saved the vampire Ehwa from being burned at the stake by his fellow villagers. While attempting to escape together, Joong-won fell off a cliff, and Ehwa gave him her blood to save him from dying. Thus, Joong-won was also transformed into a vampire.

In modern-day Seoul, the 350-year-old Joong-won runs a luxurious wine bar in Gangnam District with Ehwa. Though she holds a torch for him, Ehwa can only observe and protect her friend from afar, as he has long closed himself to any new emotion. One day, Joong-won receives a letter from a former lover, a human he had broken up with 20 years ago without telling her the truth about himself. In her letter, the dying woman asks Joong-won to look after her daughter, Ji-woo.

After her mother's funeral, Ji-woo finds a photograph her mother treasured very much, and she searches for the man in the photo, her mother's long-lost lover. When she finds Joong-won, she assumes that he is the son of the man in the photo. As Joong-won spends time with Ji-woo, all his emotions which were frozen by time start to melt away, and the two fall in love. Ehwa has difficulty dealing with this turn of events. Meanwhile, a serial killer who sucks blood from his or her victims is on the loose.

Cast
Lee Seo-jin as Baek Joong-won
Park Han-byul as Ji-woo
Son Tae-young as Ehwa
Lee In
Lee Han-wi as Park Hyung-joon
Ji Dae-han
Kim Kwang-kyu as Inspector Jang (cameo)
Eun Joo-hee

Original soundtrack
 인연 Lover
 Just Another Daybreak 350년을 기다려온 고독 350 Years Waiting in Solitude
 Sad Secret (중원의 비밀) (Joong-won's Secret)
 Never Cry
 그대도... 나처럼 You Also... Like Me (Instrumental)
 Forget Me Not - Waltz for Ji-woo (Piano Solo)
 꿈꾸는 소녀 A Girl Who Dreams
 Russian Roulette (Tango for Ehwa)
 그대도... 나처럼 You Also... Like Me (Vocal version)
 Forget Me Not - Waltz for Ji-woo (Clarinet & String version)
 I'll Make You Cry Baby - V's in the House
 Bye...Memories of Mom
 Point of No Return (End Theme)

Notes

See also
Vampire film
List of vampire television series

References

External links
Freeze official CGV website  

2006 South Korean television series debuts
2006 South Korean television series endings
Channel CGV television dramas
Vampires in television